Arisen New Era is the fourth and final album from French death metal band Kronos. Released in Europe on July 24, 2015.

Track listing
All songs written by Kronos
"Infernal Abyss Sovereignty" (4:08)
"Zeus Dethroned" (3:59)
"Soul-Voracious Vultures" (3:44)
"Rapture in Misery" (3:23)
"Klymenos Underwrath" (4:17)
"Aeons Titan Crown" (4:21)
"Brotherlords" (4:18)
"Purity Slaughtered" (4:18)
"Hellysium" (4:27)

Credits
 Grams (guitar)
 Richard (guitar)
 Tom (bass)
 Anthony (drums)
 Trivette (vocals)

References

2015 albums
Kronos (band) albums